In the United States and Canada, a Sadie Hawkins dance or turnabout is a usually informal dance sponsored by a high school, middle school or college, to which the women invite the men. This is contrary to the custom of the men typically inviting the women to school dances such as prom in the spring and homecoming in the fall.

History 
The Sadie Hawkins dance is named after the Li'l Abner comic strip character Sadie Hawkins, created by cartoonist Al Capp. In the strip, Sadie Hawkins Day fell on a given day in November (Capp never specified an exact date). The unmarried women of Dogpatch got to chase the bachelors and "marry up" with the ones that they caught. The event was introduced in a daily strip that ran on November 15, 1937. By 1939, Sadie Hawkins events were held at over 200 colleges, according to Life magazine.

Similar dance events 

The Tolo Dance in the Pacific Northwest began several decades before Capp's comic strip. The word tolo comes from the University of Washington's Mortar Board, which began as an all-women's honor society called the "Tolo Club", from the Chinook word for success and achievement. To raise funds, the group held a dance where women asked men.

See also 
 Gender roles
 Leap year, for traditions on women proposing marriage
 Powder Puff, a football game pitting girls against girls
 Winter Formal, a formal dance that may be had instead of Sadie Hawkins dances from January through March

References

External links 
 Sadie Hawkins Day
 Sadie Hawkins biography at Steve Krupp's Curio Shoppe

Gender role reversal
School dances
Li'l Abner